Pedricktown  is an unincorporated community and census-designated place (CDP) located within Oldmans Township, in Salem County, New Jersey, United States. As of the 2010 United States Census, the CDP's population was 524. The area is served as United States Postal Service ZIP code 08067.

History
On June 7, 1675 in Shadwell, England, Roger Pedrick and his wife Rebekah Holeman Pedrick, members of the Society of Friends , purchased a thousand acre tract of land from John Fenwick , and shortly there after, crossed the Atlantic to be in their new home.  They originally settled in Chester, Pennsylvania  as their home was being built their property on the other side of the Delaware.  The minutes of the "Men's and Women's Friends Meeting" (a Quaker group) refer to the area as "Pedricks Neck" in the 1720s and the birth records of many of Roger's and Rebekah's descendants list their birth place as "Pedricksburg."

Geography
According to the United States Census Bureau, Pedricktown had a total area of 0.905 square miles (2.345 km2), including 0.903 square miles (2.340 km2) of land and 0.002 square miles (0.005 km2) of water (0.21%).

Demographics

Census 2010

Economy
Goya Foods has its South Jersey division in Pedricktown.

Winery
 Salem Oak Vineyards

Transportation
Pedricktown is accessible at Exit 7 of Interstate 295 via County Route 643.

The Spitfire Aerodrome  is a small municipal airport located in Pedricktown.

References

Oldmans Township, New Jersey
Census-designated places in Salem County, New Jersey